Yao or YAO may refer to:
 Yao (surname), the transliteration of Chinese family names 姚, 銚, and 么
 Yao (ruler), a mythical Chinese ruler and emperor
 Yao Ming, Chinese Basketball All-Star that played for the Houston Rockets
 Euphrasie Kouassi Yao, Ivorian politician 
 Yao people, ethnic minority group of southern China and Vietnam
 Yao languages spoken by the Yao
 Yao people (East Africa), people of south-central Africa
 Yao language, a Bantu language spoken by the waYao people in Africa
 Yao language (Trinidad), an extinct Cariban language formerly spoken on Trinidad
 Yao may be short for yaodong, a type of Chinese cave dwelling
 Yao (Gnosticism), the name of an archon in Gnostic scripture
 Yao, Chad, a town in Chad
 Yao, Osaka, a city in Japan
 Related: Yao Airport
 Yao (爻), the term for the marks used in the preparation of trigrams and hexagrams in I Ching that is also the basis for Kangxi radical 89
 Yao, a character in Mulan (1998 film)
 Yao graph, a subgraph that guarantees connectivity
 Yo, or Yao, an American English interjection
 Mount Xiao, or Mount Yao, in Henan, China
 Mount Yao (Lushan County), in Henan, China
 a tribe by the shores of Lake Malawi
 Medicine (short story), 1922 Chinese short story by Lu Xun

YAO
 Yaoundé Airport, IATA code YAO
 Yau Oi stop, MTR station code YAO
 Yunnan Astronomical Observatory, in east suburb of Kunming, Yunnan, China

See also
Yau (disambiguation)
Yaw (disambiguation)

Language and nationality disambiguation pages